Hadi Bargizar (Persian: هادی برگی‌زر) (born 1970 in Gonbad-e Kavus, Iran) is a retired Iranian football player. After he retired he managed several clubs including F.C. Aboomoslem, Payam Mashhad, Etka Gorgan F.C. and Gostaresh Foolad F.C.

He is an ethnic Turkmen and older brother of Morteza Bargizar. Although he was born in Gonbad-e Kavus, he has lived in Mashhad since his early childhood.

Playing career

He played for F.C. Aboomoslem and Payam Mashhad throughout the 1980s and 1990s. He also represented Khorasan Provincial Team in the 1980s and 1990s at senior and youth levels.

Managerial career

He has coached F.C. Aboomoslem, Payam Mashhad and Etka Gorgan F.C.

Honours
Payam Khorasan
 Azadegan League: 2007–08

References

 

Iranian football managers
Iranian footballers
F.C. Aboomoslem players
Payam Mashhad players
1970 births
Living people
People from Gonbad-e Qabus
Iranian Turkmen people
Association football midfielders